FTL:2448 is a science fiction role playing game, created by Richard Tucholka, and published by Tri Tac Games in 1982, about faster-than-light (FTL) travel with alien races. In 1985, there was an expanded edition, and in 1990, a two-volume version of the game was released. Book One covered character creation, alien races, combat, equipment, and some scenarios. Book Two included the extensive Star-System-generation system, several campaign setups, and more background information on the overall campaign.  The 2000 PDF Edition includes an additional 100 pages of new material as well as starship blueprints, The Art of FTL, and additional material.

History
FTL:2448 was designed by Richard Tucholka and published by Tri-Tac Inc. in 1982 as a 102-page book in a plastic ring binder, with a 150-page revised edition in 1985. Two supplements were produced in 1986: Cop 2448 by Tucholka and Kreig Branden, and Star Charts by Tucholka and Lloyd Stilwell.

Plot 
FTL:2448 is set in the mid-25th century. Humans have developed faster-than-light travel. The game focus is, instead of a gleaming high-tech space setting or space battlefield, more of an industrial space-as-workplace view of the galaxy. Humanity has made contact with a number of alien races and is a primary force in the intergalactic governing body, ISCO.

Characters face the trials of maintaining and operating a starship. While not a war-based setting, there are hostile races. The game has been compared, in look and feel, to movies and settings such as Outland, Space Rangers, and Firefly, in that each of these present the galaxy as a less-than-perfect place.

Game Mechanics 
The game uses the same base system as Tri Tac's other releases, Fringeworthy and Bureau 13. The system requires the use of a full set of polyhedral dice, pencils and paper. Forms, such as character sheets and other record sheets, are provided in the book, with permission to photocopy for personal use.

Formats 
FTL:2448 is available in a hardcopy version or as a PDF file at website Tritacgames.com.

Reception
In the September–October 1983 edition of Space Gamer (No. 65), William A. Barton  commented that "FTL, while not treading any new paths, at least makes an admirable effort to cover aspects of play that too many other systems have ignored or made needlessly complex. If nothing else, I'd highly recommend it as a sourcebook for existing SFRPGs."

In the January–February 1985 edition of Different Worlds (Issue #38), Michael Doolittle gave it a very poor rating of 1 star out of 4, and outlined a host of problems with the game rules. He concluded, "Although there are several interesting ideas in FTL: 2448, I can only recommend this game if you have the time to spend tinkering with the game system, or you buy game systems looking for things to add to your campaign. Otherwise, pass this one up."

Reviews
Review in Shadis #17

References

Role-playing games introduced in 1982
Space opera role-playing games
Tri Tac Games games